Natatolana helenae is a species of crustacean in the family Cirolanidae, and was first described by Stephen John Keable in 2006. The species epithet, helenae, honours Helen Stoddart.

It is a benthic species, living at depths of about 10 m in tropical waters, and is known only from the Gulf of Carpentaria.

References

External links
Natatolana helenae occurrence data from GBIF

Cymothoida
Crustaceans of Australia
Crustaceans described in 2006
Taxa named by Stephen John Keable